The NUST Business School (NBS), formerly known as the National Institute of Management Sciences (NIMS), is the business school of National University of Sciences and Technology, Pakistan (NUST).

It was established in 1999 as the School of Business and Management Sciences (SBMS) and was later renamed to NUST Business School in 2008.

NBS offers undergraduate, graduate, and post-graduate programs in business and management. The school offers a Bachelor of Business Administration (BBA) degree, a Master of Business Administration (MBA) degree, and an Executive MBA program.

Departments
 Department of International Business and Marketing
 Department of Finance and Investment
 Department of Human Resource Management

Degree programs
NBS offers degrees in both Bachelors and Masters level.

Bachelors
 Bachelor of Business Administration (Honors)
 BS Accounting and Finance
 BS Tourism and Hospitality Management 
 Masters
 Master of Business Administration (MBA)
 Executive MBA

See also
National University of Sciences and Technology, Pakistan

External links
 NBS official website

National University of Sciences & Technology
Business schools in Pakistan